The Gossamer Penguin was a solar-powered experimental aircraft created by Paul MacCready's AeroVironment.  MacCready, whose Gossamer Condor in 1977 won the Kremer prize for human-powered flight, told reporters two weeks in June, 1980 that "The first solar-powered flight ever made took place on May 18."  The testing ground was at Minter Field outside of Shafter, California. 

The powerplant was an AstroFlight Astro-40 electric motor, driven by a 541 watt solar panel consisting of 3920 solar cells.

Initial test flights were performed using a 28 cell NiCad battery pack instead of a panel.

She flew the Penguin approximately 40 times before a  public demonstration at NASA's Dryden Flight Research Center on August 7, 1980.

Specifications

See also

References

AeroVironment aircraft
Canard aircraft
Single-engined pusher aircraft
Solar-powered aircraft
1980s United States experimental aircraft
Photovoltaics
Aircraft first flown in 1979
High-wing aircraft